Steve Rhodes (born 1964) is an English cricketer.

Steve or Stephen or Steven Rhodes may also refer to:

Steve Rhodes (journalist), American journalist
Steve Rhodes (American football) (born 1957), American football player
Stephen Rhodes (radio presenter) (1951–2017), British radio presenter since the 1970s
Stephen Rhodes (racing driver) (born 1984), American stock car racing driver
Stephen G. Rhodes (born 1977), American multimedia artist
Stephen H. Rhodes (1825–1909), American businessman and politician who served in the Massachusetts Senate
Steve Rhodes (musician), Nigerian broadcaster and musician
Steven W. Rhodes, United States bankruptcy judge

See also 
 Steve Rhoades, character on Married... with Children